Heritage Village may refer to:

Canada
 Burnaby Village Museum, Burnaby, British Columbia
 Doon Heritage Village, Kitchener, Ontario
 Mennonite Heritage Village, Steinbach, Manitoba
 Ukrainian Cultural Heritage Village, Lamont County, Alberta

United Arab Emirates
 Fujairah Heritage Village
 Heritage Village Dubai

United States
 Heritage Village, Connecticut, a census-designated place
 The Heritage Village Open, a golf tournament from 1971 to 1973
 Heritage Village (Largo, Florida)
 Heritage Village Museum, a recreated 1800s community in Sharonville, Ohio
 Heritage Farm Museum and Village, a museum in West Virginia